The association 100 Beste Plakate e.V. is an interest group for graphics, design and the graphic arts in Germany, Austria and Switzerland. The association was founded with the aim of promoting, awarding and strengthening the public awareness of the high design quality of the poster medium.

History 
The 100 Beste Plakate (100 Best Posters) association emerged from the competition Die besten Plakate des Jahres, which was founded in 1966. In 2001, the newly established association took over the organization and realignment of the contest. In the spirit of the European ideal, the contest was expanded to all German-language posters, thus integrating artists from Austria and Switzerland.

Professional associations cooperating with the association are DesignAustria, Alliance Graphique Internationale, the International Council of Graphic Design Associations, the BDG Berufsverband der Deutschen Kommunikationsdesigner e.V. and the AGD. Founding members included Klaus Staeck, Helmut Brade and Volker Pfüller.

Contest 
The association organizes a contest annually for the DACH countries. Poster designers, artists, students and printers are invited to submit the best works of the past year. It is also possible for poster clients to nominate them. An annually changing jury of graphic designers selects the 100 best from the submitted posters, which are subsequently awarded and exhibited.

The book 100 Beste Plakate / 100 Best Posters is published to accompany the competition every year.

Exhibitions 
The award-winning posters are presented to the public in Berlin (Kulturforum am Potsdamer Platz), Essen, Nuremberg, Lucerne, Zürich and the MAK – Museum of Applied Arts, Vienna as well as other changing locations in multi-week exhibitions. The posters are included in the collections of the Deutsches Plakat Museum (Folkwang Museum) Essen and the MAK.

Presidents 
 2001 to 2007: Niklaus Troxler
 2007 to 2010: Henning Wagenbreth
 2010 to 2014: Stephan Bundi
 2014 to 2018: Götz Gramlich
 since 2018: Fons Matthias Hickmann

Bibliography 
 100 Beste Plakate e.V. (ed.): 100 beste Plakate 18 – Deutschland Österreich Schweiz. Verlag Kettler, 2018, .
 Josef Müller-Brockmann: Geschichte des Plakates. Phaidon Press, 2004, .
 Jens Müller (ed.): Best German Posters Optik Books, 2016, .
 Fons Hickmann, Sven Lindhorst-Emme (eds.): Anschlag Berlin – Zeitgeistmedium Plakat. Verlag Seltmann+Söhne 2015, .

References

External links 
 Website and archives of 100 Beste Plakate e.V.
 ARTE Journal: Das Plakat, die unterschätzte Kunstform (Video)
 Page-Online: 100 Beste Plakate 2016: Die Gewinner sind da
 Der Standard: MAK zeigt 100 beste Plakate des Jahres 2017
 Tagesspiegel: Ausstellung im Kulturforum: Die hundert besten Plakate
 Form: 100 beste Plakate 2017

Art and design organizations
Arts organisations based in Germany